Boris Safarovich Ebzeyev  is a Russian politician and judge. He served as a judge on the Constitutional Court of Russia from 1991 to 2008 and as president of Karachay–Cherkessia between 2008 and 2011.

Biography 
Ebzeyev was born on February 25, 1950, in the village of Janga Jere Kyzyl-Askerskogo Frunze district of the Kirghiz SSR, where his family, like other Karachays were expelled in 1944 (he returned home with his family in 1957). He graduated from high school  in Karachiyivske, where he then worked there as a carpenter, later on as a concrete worker in a construction organization to earn some experience for admission to the Law Institute. In 1976 he fulfilled his military service. In 1972, he graduated from the Saratov State Academy of Law with an honors degree, and later on, studied for a Doctorate in Legal Sciences. Although Ebzeev is a lawyer and judge by profession, he is the author of more than 200 scientific works, including 25 books - monographs, textbooks, scientific and practical comments.

Criticism 
On 12 August 2019 the Anti-Corruption Foundation and Lyubov Sobol accused Boris Ebzeyev of illegal enrichment. According to the investigation, Boris Ebzeyev has a grandson, Arthur Borisovich Ebzeev. He was 4 years old, when he entered into a contract of purchasing an apartment in Moscow’s elite Ostozhenka district with the area of 274.2 m². Its market value estimated at around 500 million rubles. Then a 7-year-old child made a deal with an offshore from the British Virgin Islands and sold this apartment, buying a house in Rublyovka.

Awards and honors 
 Honored Scientist of the Russian Federation (2000)
 Distinguished Lawyer of the Russian Federation (2004)
 Diploma of The President of the Russian Federation (2008)

References 

 Официальный сайт Президента и Правительства Карачаево-Черкесской Республики
 
 Лента новостей «РИА Новости» — Биография
 Информационно-издательский центр «Панорама» — Биография
 Юридическая Россия — Биография
 Саратовская государственная академия права
 Борис Эбзеев: Выйти из России добровольно нас никто не заставит

1950 births
Judges of the Constitutional Court of Russia
Living people
Heads of Karachay-Cherkessia